Badnera is a town in Amravati district in the Indian state of Maharashtra.

See also
 Amravati district

References

Cities and towns in Amravati district
Amravati district